Guddu Ki Gun is a Bollywood Adult comedy film directed by the duo Shantanu Ray Chhibber & Sheershak Anand. The film stars Kunal Khemu, debutant Aparna Sharma and marks the debut of Payel Sarkar (Bengali Actress) in Bollywood . It was released on 30 October 2015. The film is based on a washing-powder salesman, Guddu who has a golden penis.

Plot
Guddu Ki Gun is the tale of Govardhan aka Guddu (Kunal Khemu), a Bihari settled in Kolkata. He is a door-to-door salesman for washing powder, whose sales pitch is "Ek washing powder ke saath Guddu free" (With one washing powder, you get Guddu for free). While sharing a room with his close friend Ladoo (Sumeet Vyas), Guddu becomes a womanizer and leads an amorous lifestyle in Kolkata. His troubles begin when he ditches one of his girlfriends, Bholi (Aparna Sharma). Furious at Guddu for forsaking his granddaughter, Bholi's grandfather, who is a magician, casts a black magic spell on him, causing his penis to turn golden. The only way Guddu can get rid of the curse is to find true love and stay faithful to her.

Cast
 Kunal Khemu as Govardhan "Guddu" Prasad
 Payel Sarkar as Kaali
 Sumeet Vyas as Ladoo	
 Nayani Dixit as Mrs.Kajol Mukhopadhyay
 Aparna Sharma as Bholi
 Shantilal Mukherjee as Anand "Antique Moshai" Mukhopadhyay, Kajol's husband 
 Flora Saini as Nurse Sarita
 Jameel Khan as Don Marwadi
 Sanchari Sengupta as Ruby Marwadi
 Brijendra Kala as Doctor J.H. Atul Dasgupta
 Biplab Chatterjee as Bholi's grandfather
 Sudeep Sarangi as Akhilesh Tripathi, reporter 
 Lacey Banghard as secial appearance in "Ding Dong" song

Soundtrack 
The soundtrack for the album was composed by Gajendra Verma, Vikram Singh, Raju Sarkar and Saqi with lyrics written by Aseem Ahmed Abbasee, Vimal Kashyap and Soumyajit Banerjee.

References

External links
 
 

2015 films
2010s Hindi-language films
Indian sex comedy films